Beaver Island may refer to the following places:

Canada
Beaver Island, Nova Scotia
Beaver Island (Saskatchewan)

Mexico
Beaver Island (Rio Grande), transferred from the U.S. in the Boundary Treaty of 1970

United States
Beaver Island (Lake Michigan), Michigan
Beaver Island Airport
Beaver Island, Michigan, an unincorporated community located on the island
Beaver Islands State Wildlife Research Area
Beaver Island (Lake Superior), Michigan
Beaver Island State Park, New York
Beaver Island Township, Stokes County, North Carolina
Beaver Island (Massachusetts)
Big Beaver Island, Lake Winnipesaukee, New Hampshire

Other countries
Beaver Island (Antarctica)
Beaver Island, Falkland Islands

See also